The 2001 Trophée des Champions was a football match held at Stade de la Meinau, Strasbourg on July 19, 2001, that saw 2000–01 Division 1 champions FC Nantes defeat 2001 Coupe de France winners RC Strasbourg 4-1.

Match details

See also
2001–02 French Division 1

2001–02 in French football
2001
RC Strasbourg Alsace matches
FC Nantes matches
July 2001 sports events in France
Sports competitions in Strasbourg